Senator Hiester may refer to:

Gabriel Hiester (1749–1824), Pennsylvania State Senate
Joseph Hiester (1752–1832), Pennsylvania State Senate
William Muhlenberg Hiester (1818–1878), Pennsylvania State Senate
William Hiester (Pennsylvania politician) (1790–1853), Pennsylvania State Senate

See also
Senator Hester (disambiguation)